Colourless or colorless may refer to:

 Transparency and translucency, transmitting all or most colours
 Neutral-density filter
 Black and white, a form of visual representation that does not use color
 Grayscale

See also
 Black and white (disambiguation)
 Monochrome (disambiguation)
 Neutral (disambiguation)
 Boredom 
 Colorfulness
 Shades of gray